Sarah J. Tompkins Garnet (née Smith) (July 31, 1831 – September 17, 1911) was an American educator and suffragist from New York City who was a pioneer an influential African-American female school principal in the New York City public school system.

Family and early life
Sarah J. Smith, daughter of Sylvanus and Anne (Springsteel) Smith, was born on July 31, 1831, in Brooklyn, New York. Sarah was the oldest of 11 children; her parents were farmers and owned land in Queens County, then part of Long Island. Her sister Susan McKinney Steward was the first African-American woman in New York State to earn a medical degree, and the third in the United States.

Sarah married Samuel Tompkins, who died in approximately 1852. A daughter from that marriage, Serena Jane Tompkins, was an accomplished pianist and organist when she died at forty-seven years old in 1898.

Pioneer educator
When Sarah began teaching in New York City, the public schools were racially segregated.
Sarah began teaching at the African Free School of Williamsburg in 1854, when Brooklyn was a sizeable city still decades from being consolidated in 1898 with New York City (then confined to Manhattan and the Bronx). In February 1863 the untimely death of Charlotte S. Smith, the beloved African American principal of Manhattan's Colored School No. 7 on West 17th Street, created an obvious vacancy. Tompkins was appointed that spring as principal of Colored School No. 7, which around 1866 the Board of Education renamed Colored School No. 4. She taught many prominent students, including musician Walter F. Craig.

Garnet retired from active school service in 1900. She served as teacher and principal for 37 years.

Suffrage
Sarah was the founder of the Brooklyn suffrage organization, Equal Suffrage League in the late 1880s. And she was the superintendent of suffrage for the National Association of Colored Women.

Later life, death, legacy
Sarah owned a seamstress shop in Brooklyn from 1883 to 1911.

On December 28, 1875, Sarah Tompkins (appearing in some records as Thompkins) wed noted abolitionist Henry Highland Garnet, and thereafter was usually identified as Sarah Garnet. Their Brooklyn marriage ceremony was performed by Amos Noë Freeman, a minister associated with the legendary escape from slavery in 1855 of Anna Maria Weems on the Underground Railroad.

In 1881 President James A. Garfield appointed Garnet as ambassador in Liberia, although Sarah did not accompany him on the trip. Garnet became ill soon after arriving abroad, and he died on February 13, 1882, in Monrovia.

In 1911 Sarah Garnet traveled with her sister Susan McKinney Steward to London, England, for the inaugural Universal Races Congress, where Steward presented the paper "Colored American Women." The conference was also attended by W. E. B. Du Bois. Soon after they returned from Europe, Sarah died at home on September 17, 1911. She is buried in Green-Wood Cemetery in Brooklyn.

The Teunis G. Bergen School was renamed in 2019 to Sarah Smith Garnet Public School 9 after a movement to remove the slaveholding Bergen Family name from a school whose students are 40 percent African-American. An article surfaced from June 1819 in which Teunis J. and Michael Bergen had placed an advertisement for a reward of $40 for return of their slaves. On March 28, 2022, the school unveiled a sign with the new name.

Middleton Playground in Brooklyn, NY, was renamed in 2021 to Sarah J.S. Tompkins Garnet Playground as a part of an NYC Parks initiative to rename parks in honor of prominent Black Americans.

References

Activists for African-American civil rights
African-American suffragists
American suffragists
People from Brooklyn
1831 births
1911 deaths
African-American educators
Activists from New York (state)
Educators from New York City
American women educators
Women civil rights activists
20th-century African-American people
20th-century African-American women
19th-century African-American women